Tsing Sha Highway is a major expressway in Hong Kong, which links the island of Tsing Yi to Sha Tin. The road is part of Route 8, which starts in Sha Tin and terminates in Tung Chung. It was opened in March 2008 and extended in December 2009.

History
Tsing Sha Highway was built in three stages.

The section that is known as Route T3 is in Tai Wai. The contract was awarded on 16 March 2003 and construction commenced on 26 March 2003. The southbound bridge was completed on 23 November 2005, and the northbound bridge in March 2008. This section cost approximately HK$2,120.2 million to build. This section has two exits; 1 and 1A.

The section between the end of Road T3 and Stonecutters Island commenced construction in November 2002 and was opened on 21 March 2008. It includes the Tai Wai Tunnel, the Sha Tin Heights Tunnel and the Eagle's Nest Tunnel. This section has five exits; 1B, 1C, 2A, 2B and 2C.

The section between Stonecutters Island and Tsing Yi commenced construction in April 2002 and was opened on 20 December 2009. It includes the Stonecutters Bridge and the Nam Wan Tunnel. This section has three exits; 2D, 3 and 3A. Before this section was completed, all cars continuing with Tsing Sha Highway have taken exit 2C and so those cars who wish to go to Lantau should use exit 2A.

Alignment
The road starts off in Sha Tin at an intersection with Tai Po Road – Sha Tin, then heads southwest towards Cheung Sha Wan through the Tai Wai Tunnel, Sha Tin Heights Tunnel and Eagle's Nest Tunnel.

After passing through the Eagle's Nest Tunnel, the road interchanges with Ching Cheung Road of Route 7. The road then goes into a flyover, passing over Cheung Sha Wan. At this point the road interchanges at Lai Wan Interchange with Tsing Kwai Highway and West Kowloon Highway of Route 3.

The road continues as a flyover across Stonecutters Island, then turns onto the Stonecutters Bridge towards Tsing Yi. After arriving at Tsing Yi, the road goes through the Nam Wan Tunnel, passing under Tsing Yi's hills, then comes out on the other side of Tsing Yi. The road intersects with Route 3 again at North West Tsing Yi Interchange, and then terminates, leading on to the Lantau Link.

According to the road signs, the speed limit for the section on the north of the toll plaza is 70 km/h, while at the south of the toll plaza the speed limit is increased to 80 km/h.

Interchanges

Tai Wai Tunnel

The shortest of the three tunnels on Route T3 of the main Route 8 and runs from Shatin to Hin Tin.

References

External links
 Transport Department – Driving along Tsing Sha Highway

Roads in the New Territories
Expressways in Hong Kong
Route 8 (Hong Kong)
Sha Tin
Tai Wai
Cheung Sha Wan
Tsing Yi
Stonecutters Island